Logone-et-Chari  is a department of Extreme-Nord Province in Cameroon. The department covers an area of 12,133 km and at the 2005 Census had a total population of 486,997. The capital of the department is at Kousséri. Most inhabitants of this department speak Chadian Arabic.

Subdivisions
The department is divided administratively into 10 communes and in turn into villages.

Communes
 Blangoua
 Darak
 Fotokol
 Goulfey
 Hile-Alifa
 Kousséri
 Logone-Birni
 Makary
 Waza
 Zina

Languages
Languages spoken include:
 Afade
 Chadian Arabic
 Jina
 Kuo
 Lagwan
 Majera
 Malgbe
 Maslam
 Masana
 Nzakambay

References

Departments of Cameroon
Far North Region (Cameroon)